Sigma Phi Lambda, also known as Sisters for the Lord or Phi Lamb, is a Christian sorority founded in 1988 in Austin, Texas.

History
Sigma Phi Lambda was founded in 1988 at the University of Texas at Austin.  Its Founders were:
 Patricia Adams Hogan
 Robin Maedgen
 Gina Williams Goveas
 Jacqueline Goveas
 Eileen Howell Barlow.

Phi Lamb was part of a broader movement to establish Christian sororities during the mid-1980s, as the Evangelical Christian movement was on the rise in the United States.

Phi Lamb itself was also a part of the same movement as it affected men's fraternities.  The establishment of Sigma Phi Lambda can be linked to the founders' experiences and interactions with their male counterparts, who had, three years earlier, founded the Christian fraternity, Beta Upsilon Chi at Texas.

Sigma Phi Lambda has also spread the idea of Christian Greek Organizations.  After the establishment of the Texas Tech University chapter, a group of men founded Kappa Upsilon Chi to serve as a counterpart.

Since establishment, the number of chapters has grown rapidly.  The chapters on the campuses of the University of Texas, Texas A&M, Texas Tech, Oklahoma, Oklahoma State and Florida have well over 100 sisters, and the sorority continues to actively develop new chapters around the country.

Many local sororities arose during same period as Phi Lamb's founding across the country, but only a handful were successful in national expansion.  Phi Lamb's success was accomplished through incorporation, a national board of directors and a national director.

Sigma Phi Lambda was the third National Sorority for Christian women, independent of a Greek council for colleges and universities.  Alpha Delta Chi was first in 1925 founded at UCLA. Sigma Alpha Omega was the first sorority to be founded in the 1980s resurgence of Christian Greek Life, founded at East Carolina University in 1987.  Phi Lamb seeks spiritual development through their sisterhood.  Their traditions develop these standards.

Structure, Traditions and Symbols
Sigma Phi Lambda is not like most traditional sororities because it is a non-denominational and non-Panhellenic sorority.  While most traditional sororities and even some Christian sororities limit potential new members from holding membership in more than one sorority, Sigma Phi Lambda allows other sorority initiates to be initiated into Phi Lamb and also allows Phi Lamb members to hold multiple Greek affiliations including but not limited to membership in National Panhellenic Conference and National Pan-Hellenic Council sororities.

Sigma Phi Lambda does not offer membership bids. The stance of the organization is that a woman is to choose Phi Lamb. Phi Lamb does not choose their members or exclude women from membership.

Sigma Phi Lambda holds multiple social and philanthropic events each semester to promote external growth and outreach.  These are sometimes done with other Christian organizations on campus. Devotionals or testimonies are given at such open parties. The sorority's national charitable focus is World Vision, a Christian humanitarian organization dedicated to working with children, families and their communities worldwide.

Symbols
The symbols of Phi Lamb include:
Official colors: Red and white, symbolizing the blood and purity of Jesus Christ
Official mascot: A lamb named Baasheeba, symbolizes the sisters' relationship with Jesus Christ. The mascot is also based on the nickname of "Phi Lamb" and the Psalm 100:3.
Official belief statement: the Apostles' Creed

During chapter meetings, soft praise and worship music is played to wrap up individual prayer time. Phi Lamb has various prayer nights, prayer groups, and prayer partners within the chapter. Prayer partners are accountability partners that are set up for spending quality time with another sister to pray and get to know one another better. Phi Lamb has engagement circles that are a way of honoring ladies who become engaged while members.

Gifts are given to graduating seniors. Officers cook and serve meals at retreat. Phi Lamb has an official dance that is danced to the song "Shackles" by Mary Mary.

Membership
Membership is open to any undergraduate or graduate student, another uniqueness considering most sororities limit membership to undergraduates only. Married women may also become members of Sigma Phi Lambda, so long as she is still a student.  Members "pledge" for one semester where they are the "little sisters" before being initiated into the sorority. Initiation is a formal event. It is conducted according to a complete and secret script written by the founding mothers. The tradition of initiation is very important to Phi Lamb and is treated as such. There are several informal traditions each chapter follows in regards to initiation, such as: going out to dinner afterwards, giving James Avery pins during initiation, big sisters edifying their little sisters, and giving flowers to retiring officers at the closing ceremony for the new officers.

Cable Groups

Small groups that operate within chapter meetings, used for discussion, prayer, and various activities.

Organization
National Board of Directors – Phi Lamb is governed by a Board of Directors made up of five alumnae who make policy decisions for the organization.

Executive Director – The Executive Director, or ED, helps found new Phi Lamb chapters, assisting the Board with daily tasks, and plans the All-Chapter Officer Retreat.

Regional Directors – Regional Directors oversee multiple chapters. They work with the Alumnae Council and visit chapters to help guide the chapter in planning and decision-making.

Alumnae Councils – After a chapter has been established long enough to have alumnae, an Alumnae Council is formed. Made up of three members, these must be former officers or founders of that chapter.  The Alumnae Council provides guidance to the chapter and assistance to the Regional Director.

Officers – Five officers are elected annually in each chapter, generally in the Spring.  The offices are: President, Vice President, Chaplain, Secretary, and Treasurer.  These officers perform the daily functions and lead the members of their chapter. There are also a number of appointed officer positions in each chapter depending on the chapter's individual needs. All officers must sign and abide by a covenant created by the national board.

Actives – Active, or initiated, members of Phi Lamb are considered the "big sisters" of their chapter.  They hold voting rights and may hold elected or appointed officer positions.

New Members – New members of Phi Lamb, or uninitiated members, are termed the "little sisters" of their chapter.  The terminology, an extension of a "big sister/little sister" dynamic was designed to reduce the risk of hazing, and is described by the sorority in familial terms: "little sisters are cherished by their big sisters" and are a vital part of Phi Lamb. Upon initiation into the sorority, they become Active members.

Sigma Phi Lambda Sorority Verse

Romans 15:5-6 ~ "May the God who gives endurance and encouragement give you a spirit of unity among yourselves as you follow Christ Jesus, so that with one heart and one mouth you may glorify the God and Father of our Lord Jesus Christ."

Chapters
This is the list of chapters of Sigma Phi Lambda.  Active chapters and colonies are noted in bold, inactive chapters in italics.

References

External links

 
1988 establishments in Texas